The Neighbourhood is the third studio album by American alternative band The Neighbourhood. It was released on March 9, 2018 by Columbia Records. It was preceded by two EPs: Hard, which was released on September 22, 2017, and To Imagine, released on January 12, 2018. The tracks from the extended plays that were not finally included on the album were compiled in another EP called Hard to Imagine. These tracks were also released in an additional disc on the digital deluxe edition of the album. An edition known as Hard to Imagine the Neighbourhood Ever Changing was released on November 2, 2018 and included all of the EPs' contents and all but two songs from the original album.

Singles
The lead single, "Scary Love" was premiered as December 4, 2017's Zane Lowe's World Record and properly released on digital platforms the next day. To promote the track, the band performed it at The Late Late Show with James Corden on February 20, 2018 and premiered its official music video starring Tommy Wiseau the album's release day, on March 9, 2018.

Before the album's release, two tracks were made available with its pre-order; "Void" on February 16, 2018 and "Nervous" on March 2, 2018.

Track listing

Charts

Weekly charts

Year-end charts

Release history

References

2018 albums
The Neighbourhood albums
Columbia Records albums
Electropop albums